Camerton (Somerset) railway station served the village of Camerton, England from 1882 to 1951 on the Bristol and North Somerset Railway. In common with the other stations on the line it had a single platform for passengers, but also had a loop line so that two trains could pass. Diverging away from the through line at the east end of the station was the access line and associated sidings belonging to Camerton colliery. There was a substantial station building on the platform - this originally had a canopy but this was removed after passenger services ceased.

History 
The station opened in 1882 by the Great Western Railway. The station was only open to passengers for 18 years, closing on 21 September 1925 and to goods traffic on 15 February 1951. It had an unusual history in that it was originally the terminus of a branch from the west (from Hallatrow), was then the main station on a through route when the branch was extended eastwards to Limpley Stoke, and was finally the terminus of a branch from the east after the section westward to Hallatrow was closed in 1932 .

References

External links 

Disused railway stations in Somerset
Former Great Western Railway stations
Railway stations in Great Britain opened in 1907
Railway stations in Great Britain closed in 1925
1907 establishments in England
1951 disestablishments in England